Galoppfältet is a Swedish railway station connected by Roslagsbanan in Täby municipality. Named after the nearby Täby Racecourse (Täby Galopp), the station is located about 13 km from Stockholm East Station. It consists of a middle platform with entrances from both sides.

History 
The railway stop of Galoppfältet was established in 1913 and was then called Åkerby. Since the establishment of Täby Galoppe Field next to the station, the name was changed in 1960. In 1993, the Roslagsbanan line was improved with double tracks from Roslags Näsby railway station and after the Galoppfältet the line is converted to a single track. In August 2010, the double track was extended until Viggbyholm station.

Area 
Within 500m radius of the stop area, a high school and a business park and a large bus garage and a hotel were built. There are several clubs in the area such as Täby Transmitters radio club and two large tenants associations with a total of 1700 apartments and approximately 3,500 inhabitants.

Projects 
Täby Galoppe Field is planned to be replaced with a big project for houses and other buildings. This project is expected to increase the significance of the stop. The new district planned in the area has been named Täby park. Whether or not the station will be renamed is not yet decided, but the Galopp Field name may be perceived as misleading in the near future.

References 

Railway stations in Stockholm County
Railway stations opened in 1913